Mikhaylovka is a rural locality (a selo) in Karmyshevsky Selsoviet, Alsheyevsky District, Bashkortostan, Russia. The population was 89 as of 2010. There are 2 streets.

Geography 
Mikhaylovka is located 35 km northwest of Rayevsky (the district's administrative centre) by road.

References 

Rural localities in Alsheyevsky District